Home Struck is a 1927 American silent film directed by Ralph Ince and starring Viola Dana, Alan Brooks and Tom Gallery.

Cast
 Viola Dana as Barbara Page  
 Alan Brooks as Lyn Holmes  
 Tom Gallery as Dick Cobb  
 Nigel Barrie as Warren Townsend  
 George Irving as President Wallace  
 Charles Howard as Nick Cohen

References

Bibliography
 Quinlan, David. The Illustrated Guide to Film Directors. Batsford, 1983.

External links

1927 films
Films directed by Ralph Ince
American silent feature films
1920s English-language films
American black-and-white films
Film Booking Offices of America films
1920s American films